Hedychrum nobile is a species of cuckoo wasps (insect in the family Chrysididae).

Subspecies
 Hedychrum nobile antigai  R. du Buysson, 1896
 Hedychrum nobile nobile (Scopoli, 1763)

Description
Head, scutellum, post scutellum and median segment are blue or green, pronotum, mesonotum and the abdomen are golden purple.

Ecology
These wasps fly from mid-June to September. Usually they prefer sandy habitats and rocky slopes. The main host species of this parasitic wasp is Cerceris arenaria.

Distribution
This species can be found in Austria, France, Germany, Greece, Italy, Poland, Portugal, Spain, Switzerland, in the eastern Palearctic realm and in North Africa.

Bibliography
 Heiko Bellmann: Bienen, Wespen, Ameisen. Hautflügler Mitteleuropas. Franckh-Kosmos Verlags-GmbH & Co KG, Stuttgart 1995, .
 Rolf Witt: Wespen. Beobachten, Bestimmen. Naturbuch-Verlag, Augsburg 1998, .

References

Chrysididae
Hymenoptera of Europe
Insects described in 1763
Taxa named by Giovanni Antonio Scopoli